The following lists events that happened during 1917 in Australia.

Incumbents

 Monarch – George V
 Governor-General – The Right Hon. Sir Ronald Munro-Ferguson
 Prime Minister – Billy Hughes
 Chief Justice – Samuel Griffith

State premiers
 Premier of New South Wales – William Holman
 Premier of South Australia – Crawford Vaughan (until 14 July), then Archibald Peake
 Premier of Queensland – T. J. Ryan
 Premier of Tasmania – Walter Lee
 Premier of Western Australia – Frank Wilson (until 28 June), then Henry Lefroy
 Premier of Victoria – Sir Alexander Peacock (until 29 November), then John Bowser

State governors
 Governor of New South Wales – Sir Gerald Strickland (until 28 October)
 Governor of South Australia – Lieutenant Colonel Sir Henry Galway
 Governor of Queensland – Major Sir Hamilton Goold-Adams
 Governor of Tasmania – Sir William Ellison-Macartney (until 31 March), then Sir Francis Newdegate (from 6 July)
 Governor of Western Australia – Major General Sir Harry Barron (until 27 February), then Sir William Ellison-Macartney (from 9 April)
 Governor of Victoria – Sir Arthur Stanley

Events
20 March – Lieutenant Frank Hubert McNamara becomes the first Australian airman to receive the Victoria Cross.
5 May – A federal election is held. The incumbent Nationalist government led by Billy Hughes is returned to power.
5 May – Queenslanders reject a referendum to abolish the state's Legislative Council.
2 August – The General Strike of 1917 begins, a massive industrial action involving over 100,000 workers in support of railway workers in Sydney.
17 October – The two-halves of the Trans-Australian Railway meet.
15 November – A general election is held in Victoria. The Commonwealth Liberal Party led by John Bowser defeats the incumbent Labour government led by Sir Alexander Peacock.
29 November – The "Egg Throwing Incident" takes place in the town of Warwick, Queensland. A man throws an egg at Prime Minister Billy Hughes, and the refusal of Queensland Police Service to arrest him leads to the forming of the Commonwealth Police Force.
12 December – The Royal Australian Navy battlecruiser HMAS Australia is damaged in a collision with the British cruiser HMS Repulse.
20 December – The second plebiscite on the issue of military conscription was held; it was defeated.
 Daniel Mannix becomes a Catholic archbishop of Melbourne. He publicly supports Sinn Féin.

Arts and literature

 Foundation of Australian Entertainment Industry Association (AEIA), the peak body for Australia's live entertainment and performing arts industry.

Film

19 March – Our Friends, the Hayseeds released in Sydney.  The film made by Beaumont Smith was Australia's first substantial film comedy.

Sport
 The Melbourne Cup is won by Westcourt
 The 1917 NSWRFL Premiership is won for the third year in a row by Balmain.
 The Sheffield Shield is not contested due to the war

Births
17 February – Harry Gibbs, Chief Justice of the High Court (died 2005)
11 March – Nancy Cato, writer (died 2000)
14 March – John McCallum, actor (died 2010)
21 March – Frank Hardy, novelist (Power Without Glory) (died 1994)
25 March – Barbara Jefferis, author (died 2004)
22 April – Sidney Nolan, artist (died 1992)
30 April – Mervyn Wood, Olympic rower (died 2006)
3 May – James Penberthy, composer (died 1999)
7 May – Lenox Hewitt,  public servant (died 2020)
15 May – Ron Saggers, cricketer (died 1987)
25 May – James Plimsoll, Governor of Tasmania from 1982–1987 (died 1987)
2 June – Peggy Antonio, female Test cricketer (died 2002)
14 July – Pat Moran, statistician (died 1988)
17 July – Jack Beale, politician and first Environment Minister (died 2006)
19 August – Laurie Aarons, leader of the Australian Communist Party (died 2005)
20 August – Dudley Erwin, politician (died 1984)
7 September – John Cornforth, Australian chemist, Nobel Prize laureate (died 2013)
12 September – Charles Jones, politician (died 2003)
19 September – Paterson Clarence Hughes, RAF pilot (killed in action 1940)
30 September – Kim Beazley Sr., Federal politician (died 2007)
2 October – Phil Ridings, cricketer (died 1998)
5 October – Kenneth Jacobs, Chief Justice of the High Court (died 2015)
17 October – Sumner Locke Elliott, novelist (died 1991)
20 October – D'Arcy Niland, novelist (died 1967)
21 November – Tom Reynolds, VFL footballer (Essendon and St Kilda) (died 2002)
22 November – Jon Cleary, novelist (died 2010)
8 December – Ian Johnson, cricketer (died 1998)
12 December – Xavier Connor, jurist (died 2005)
25 December – Tim Walker, NSW politician (died 1986)
31 December – Pat Hills, NSW politician (died 1992)

Deaths
 31 March – Joseph Cullen, New South Wales and Western Australian politician (b. 1849)
 5 April – E. H. Coombe, South Australian politician and newspaper editor (b. 1858)
 6 May – Thomas Carr, Catholic archbishop (born in Ireland) (b. 1839)
 24 May – Les Darcy, boxer (died in the United States) (b. 1895)
 15 August – John Haynes, New South Wales politician and journalist (b. 1850)
 26 August – William Lane, journalist and labour movement pioneer (born in the United Kingdom) (b. 1861)
 15 September – Carty Salmon, Victorian politician (b. 1860)
 17 September – Edward Petherick, book collector and bibliographer (born in the United Kingdom) (b. 1847)
 31 October – Tibby Cotter, cricketer and soldier (died in the Ottoman Empire) (b. 1883)
 9 November – Harry Trott, cricketer (b. 1866)
 20 December – Frederick McCubbin, artist (b. 1855)

See also 
 List of Australian films of the 1910s

References 

 
Australia
Years of the 20th century in Australia